Carlos Javier Palomino Muñoz, age 16, was murdered in Madrid, Spain on 11 November 2007. While traveling with 100 others to attend a counter-protest to a neo-Nazi rally, he was stabbed to death at Legazpi Station.

Josué Estébanez de la Hija, the man who stabbed him, was originally from the Basque Country and was a soldier in the Spanish army. He received a 26-year prison sentence.

Background 
On the morning of 11 November 2007, a demonstration against immigration had been called by the far right-wing party Democracia Nacional, in a neighbourhood with a significant immigrant presence, which had been communicated and accepted by the Government Delegation in Madrid. According to the judicial summary, Josué Estébanez (Galdacano, 1984), was supposed to be on his way to take part in the demonstration, a fact he denied since, according to his version, he was going to have lunch in Villaverde with some friends.

Thanks to the metro's video surveillance cameras, it can be seen how, at Legazpi station on line 3, several antifascists around a hundred enter the carriage on their way to take part in the counter-demonstration. In that carriage is Josué Estébanez, who takes out a knife from his pocket and hides it behind his back. Estébanez is wearing a Three Stroke branded sweatshirt, identified as Far Right skinhead symbolism. One of the antifascist men getting into the carriage notices that Josué Estébanez is carrying the knife, but Carlos Palomino, on entering the carriage, does not notice this and reprimands Estébanez about the sweatshirt. At that moment, Estébanez stabbed Palomino in his chest, affecting his heart, which would later cause his death.

After the incident, Josué stabbed another young man, he was injured but survived, Estebanez also cut the finger of a third antifascist who tried to stop him. Finally, police came into the metro station, and shot smoke grenades in the metro. Josué Estébanez, then, proceeded to run away. He fled outside, threw the knife on the floor. Josué ran and fell on another band of antifascists outside of the metro station. He was intercepted by some of Palomino's companions. He was finally arrested by a patrol of the Municipal Police, was driven to a hospital in emergency to be healed. That same night, he was detained in Soto del Real and later transferred to Alcalá Meco to await trial. He was then judged and sentenced to 26 years. .

Carlos Palomino died minutes after the stabbing in a makeshift medical tent on Paseo de las Delicias in Madrid.

Trial and sentencing 
During the trial, which was attended as a private prosecution by the mother of Carlos Palomino and the young people who accompanied him, and Esteban Ibarra – leader of the Movement against Intolerance – as part of the popular prosecution, the facts of murder were considered proven after viewing the video surveillance cameras. Also, Josué Estébanez was a right-wing extremist due to the fact that he was wearing a sweatshirt of a brand considered to be neo-Nazi symbolism, as well as gestures that could be observed in the said recording, such as the shout and greeting "Sieg Heil". At all times, the accused tried to dissociate himself from the ultra movement, despite the fact that various fascist and neo-Nazi associations openly showed their support for him. The psychotic break and mental imbalance were also ruled out. During the trial, Estébanez showed no remorse for the acts; he only intervened on the last day of the trial to ask for forgiveness for what had happened.

The defence requested a prison sentence of six months for reckless homicide and three months for a crime of injury for the stabbing of a second person. After two years of trial, the Provincial Court of Madrid sentenced Josué Estébanez to a total of 26 years in prison – 19 years for the crime of murder with the aggravating circumstance of ideological hatred and 7 years for attempted homicide, plus compensation of 150,000 euros. The family prosecution asked for 37 years in prison and compensation, while the Alto del Arenal residents' association and the Movement against Intolerance asked for 30 years for hate crime. The sentence was confirmed in its entirety in cassation by the Second Chamber of the Supreme Court in its judgement 360/2010 of 22 April, making the conviction final.

Consequences and tributes 
The murder of Carlos Palomino was the most publicised neo-Nazi hate crime of the first decade of the 21st century in Spain. It was also the first time that the Spanish judiciary applied the aggravating factor of ideological motives in a conviction.

After Palomino's death, his mother, Mavi Muñoz, became an anti-fascist activist. She founded the Association of Victims of Fascist, Racist and Homophobic Violence, to fight against fascist violence and demand the outlawing of these groups, and is a member of the association Mothers Against Repression of which she is honorary president.

Anti-fascist collectives placed plaques on up to four occasions at the Metro stations where Carlos Palomino had died, but they were always vandalised. In 2016, Madrid City Council placed a plaque at number 145 Paseo de las Delicias, where Palomino was murdered.

The plaque reads "Aquí fue asesinado el 11 de noviembre de 2007 Carlos Javier Palomino Muñoz a la edad de 16 años, luchador contra el fascismo y el racismo" 

Every 11 November, various anti-fascist groups organise demonstrations to pay tribute to Carlos Palomino, 2021222324 who has become a symbol of their struggle. In 2017, the tenth anniversary of the crime, a demonstration was organised in Madrid, attended by around a thousand people. On that date, protest actions were also held in other Spanish cities. As a memorial, the water in various fountains is often dyed red during demonstrations.

A brigade of Spaniards, in imitation of the International Brigades, went to the conflict in Ukraine in 2014, forming the Carlos Palomino Brigade.

References 

2007 murders in Spain
2007 in Madrid
Assassinated activists
Assassinated Spanish people
Deaths by person in Spain
Deaths by stabbing in Spain
Filmed assassinations
Male murder victims
Murdered students
Neo-Nazism in Spain
People murdered in Spain
Spanish anti-fascists
Political violence in Spain
Filmed killings